Phomopsis theae is a fungal plant pathogen infecting tea.

References

External links
 USDA ARS Fungal Database

Fungal plant pathogens and diseases
Tea diseases
theae
Taxa named by Thomas Petch
Fungi described in 1925